Egindikol (Egındıköl) is a village in northern-central Kazakhstan. It is the administrative center of Egindikol District in Akmola Region. Population:

References

Populated places in Akmola Region